Earthquakes in 2009 resulted in 1,853 fatalities. The 2nd Sumatra earthquake caused an estimated 1,117 deaths to that island, while other majors events struck Italy or Costa Rica. Also notable, the 2009 Samoa earthquake and tsunami registered an 8.1 on the moment magnitude scale, the most powerful earthquake in 2009. The tsunami associated with the Samoa earthquake caused tsunami advisories and warning across the Pacific Ocean rim, also known as the Ring of Fire.

Compared to other years

Overall

By death toll

 Note: At least 10 dead

By magnitude

 Note: At least 7.0 magnitude

By month

January 

  A magnitude 7.7 earthquake struck Papua, Indonesia on January 3, killing 5 people.
  A magnitude 6.6 earthquake struck Northern Afghanistan on January 3.
  A magnitude 7.4 earthquake struck Papua, Indonesia on January 3.
  A magnitude 4.3 earthquake struck Greece, killing 1 person.
  A magnitude 6.0 earthquake struck Papua, Indonesia on January 6.
  A magnitude 6.1 earthquake struck Costa Rica on January 8. 98 people are dead or missing.
 A magnitude 6.0 earthquake occurred in the Eastern Indian Ocean on January 13.
  A magnitude 6.7 earthquake struck near the Loyalty Islands on January 15.
  A magnitude 7.4 earthquake struck the Kuril Islands on January 15.
  A magnitude 6.4 earthquake struck near the Kermadec Islands, New Zealand on January 18.
  A magnitude 6.6 earthquake struck near the Loyalty Islands on January 19.
  A magnitude 6.0 earthquake struck near the Loyalty Islands on January 19.
  A magnitude 6.1 earthquake struck near the Loyalty Islands on January 21.
  A magnitude 6.1 earthquake struck New Britain, Papua New Guinea on January 22.
  A magnitude 6.1 earthquake struck the Banda Sea on January 22.
  A magnitude 5.0 earthquake struck Xinjiang, China on January 25.

February

  A magnitude 6.0 earthquake struck Peru on February 2.
 A magnitude 6.0 earthquake occurred in the South Pacific Ocean on February 9.
  A magnitude 7.2 earthquake struck the Talaud Islands, Indonesia on February 11.
  A magnitude 6.0 earthquake struck the Talaud Islands, Indonesia on February 11.
  A magnitude 6.0 earthquake struck the Talaud Islands, Indonesia on February 12.
  A magnitude 6.0 earthquake struck the Talaud Islands, Indonesia on February 12.
  A magnitude 6.3 earthquake struck the Talaud Islands, Indonesia on February 12.
  A magnitude 6.1 earthquake struck Northern Peru on February 15.
  A magnitude 6.0 earthquake struck near the Kermadec Islands, New Zealand on February 17.
  A magnitude 7.0 earthquake struck near the Kermadec Islands, New Zealand on February 18.
  A magnitude 6.0 earthquake struck the Talaud Islands, Indonesia on February 22.
  A magnitude 6.3 earthquake struck the South Sandwich Islands on February 28.

March 

  A magnitude 4.6 earthquake struck Victoria, Australia on March 6, causing minor damage.
  A magnitude 6.5 earthquake occurred in the Greenland Sea on March 6.
  A magnitude 6.3 earthquake struck off the coast of Panama on March 12.
  A magnitude 6.3 earthquake struck the Talaud Islands on March 16.
  A magnitude 7.6 earthquake struck Tonga on March 19.
  A magnitude 6.0 earthquake struck Papua, Indonesia on March 28.
  A magnitude 6.0 earthquake struck off the shore of Kodiac Island, Alaska on March 30.

April 

  A magnitude 6.4 earthquake struck off the north coast of Papua New Guinea on April 1.
  A magnitude 6.3 earthquake stuck near the Talaud Islands on April 4.
  A magnitude 6.3 earthquake struck Abruzzo, Italy on April 6, killing 309 people.
  A magnitude 6.9 earthquake struck the Kuril Islands on April 7.
  A magnitude 6.3 earthquake struck off the west coast of the Galapagos Islands, Ecuador on April 15.
  A magnitude 6.7 earthquake struck near the South Sandwich Islands on April 16.
  A magnitude 5.5 earthquake struck Eastern Afghanistan on April 16, killing 22 people.
  A magnitude 6.1 earthquake struck Iquique, Chile on April 17.
  A magnitude 6.6 earthquake struck the Kuril Islands on April 18.
  A magnitude 6.1 earthquake struck the Talaud Islands on April 19.
  A magnitude 6.2 earthquake struck the Kuril Islands on April 21.
  A magnitude 6.1 earthquake struck the Kermadec Islands on April 26.
  A magnitude 5.8 earthquake struck Guerrero, Mexico on April 27, killing 2 people.

May 

  A magnitude 6.3 earthquake struck Guatemala on May 3.
  A magnitude 6.1 earthquake struck off the coast of Ecuador on May 10.
  A magnitude 6.1 earthquake struck New Britain, Papua New Guinea on May 12.
  A magnitude 6.5 earthquake struck the Kermadec Islands on May 16.
  A magnitude 6.0 earthquake struck the Kermadec Islands on May 24.
  A magnitude 7.3 earthquake struck off the coast of Honduras on May 23, killing 7 people and causing damage in Honduras, Guatemala, and Belize.

June 

  A magnitude 6.3 earthquake struck Vanuatu on June 2.
  A magnitude 6.0 earthquake struck the Prince Edward Islands on June 4.
  A magnitude 6.4 earthquake struck Hokkaido, Japan on June 5.
 A magnitude 6.0 earthquake occurred in the North Atlantic Ocean on June 6.
  A magnitude 6.0 earthquake stuck Vanuatu on June 12.
  A magnitude 5.4 earthquake struck Eastern Kazakhstan on June 13, killing 1 person.
  A magnitude 6.1 earthquake struck the Talaud Islands on June 14.
  A magnitude 6.1 earthquake struck near Bouvet Island on June 16.

July 

  A magnitude 6.4 earthquake struck Crete, Greece on July 1.
  A magnitude 6.0 earthquake struck Sinaloa, Mexico on July 3.
  A magnitude 6.1 earthquake struck Panama on July 4.
  A magnitude 6.1 earthquake struck the Aleutian Islands, Alaska on July 6.
  A magnitude 6.1 earthquake struck off the west coast of Greenland on July 7.
  A magnitude 6.0 earthquake struck southeast of Easter Island on July 8.
  A magnitude 6.1 earthquake struck Southern Peru on July 12.
  A magnitude 6.3 earthquake struck off the east coast of Taiwan on July 13.
  A magnitude 5.7 earthquake struck Yunnan, China on July 9, killing 1 person.
  A magnitude 7.8 earthquake struck the South Island of New Zealand on July 15.
  A magnitude 6.1 earthquake struck New Ireland, Papua New Guinea on July 15.

August 

 A magnitude 6.1 earthquake occurred in the South Pacific Ocean on August 1.
  A magnitude 6.1 earthquake struck Papua, Indonesia on August 2.
  A magnitude 6.9 earthquake struck the Gulf of California on August 3.
  A magnitude 6.2 earthquake struck the Gulf of California on August 3.
  A magnitude 6.1 earthquake struck the Ryukyu Islands, Japan on August 5.
  A magnitude 6.1 earthquake struck the South Island of New Zealand on August 5.
  A magnitude 3.7 earthquake struck Sichuan, China on August 8, killing 2 people.
  A magnitude 6.6 earthquake struck the Santa Cruz Islands on August 10.
  A magnitude 7.5 earthquake struck the Andaman Islands on August 10.
  A magnitude 6.1 earthquake struck Shizuoka, Japan on August 10, killing 1 person.
  A magnitude 6.7 earthquake struck the Ryukyu Islands, Japan on August 17.
  A magnitude 6.1 earthquake struck the Ryukyu Islands, Japan on August 17.
  A magnitude 6.3 earthquake struck near the Kermadec Islands, New Zealand on August 18.
  A magnitude 6.0 earthquake struck the Norwegian Sea on August 20.
  A magnitude 6.9 earthquake struck the Banda Sea on August 28.
  A magnitude 6.2 earthquake struck Northern Qinghai, China on August 28.
  A magnitude 6.6 earthquake struck Samoa on August 30.

September 

  A magnitude 7.0 earthquake struck Java, Indonesia on September 2, killing 81 people.
  A magnitude 6.2 earthquake struck the Kermadec Islands, New Zealand on September 2.
  A magnitude 6.2 earthquake struck Kyushu, Japan on September 3.
  A magnitude 6.2 earthquake struck offshore of Java, Indonesia on September 7.
  A magnitude 6.0 earthquake struck Georgia on September 7.
  A magnitude 6.0 earthquake struck the Kuril Islands on September 10.
  A magnitude 6.3 earthquake struck offshore Carabobo, Venezuela on September 12.
  A magnitude 6.2 earthquake struck near Easter Island on September 17.
  A magnitude 6.1 earthquake struck Bhutan on September 21, killing 11 people.
  A magnitude 6.0 earthquake struck the Auckland Islands on September 23.
  A magnitude 6.4 earthquake struck offshore Guadalajara, Mexico on September 24.
  A magnitude 8.1 earthquake struck Samoa on September 29, killing 192 people.
  A magnitude 6.0 earthquake struck Samoa on September 29.
  A magnitude 6.0 earthquake struck Samoa on September 29.
  A magnitude 7.6 earthquake struck Sumatra, Indonesia on September 30, killing 1,117 people.

October 

  A magnitude 6.6 earthquake struck Sumatra, Indonesia on October 1, killing 3 people.
  A magnitude 6.1 earthquake struck Tonga on October 2.
  A magnitude 6.0 earthquake struck near Fiji on October 2.
  A magnitude 6.1 earthquake struck Taiwan on October 3.
  A magnitude 6.6 earthquake struck the Moro Gulf, Philippines on October 4.
  A magnitude 6.8 earthquake struck the Celebes Sea on October 7.
  A magnitude 7.7 earthquake struck Vanuatu on October 7.
  A magnitude 7.8 earthquake struck Vanuatu on October 7.
  A magnitude 6.8 earthquake struck Vanuatu on October 7.
  A magnitude 7.4 earthquake struck Vanuatu on October 7.
  A magnitude 6.6 earthquake struck Vanuatu on October 8.
  A magnitude 6.8 earthquake struck Vanuatu on October 8.
  A magnitude 6.0 earthquake struck Vanuatu on October 8.
  A magnitude 6.1 earthquake struck Vanuatu on October 8.
  A magnitude 6.0 earthquake struck Vanuatu on October 8.
  A magnitude 6.0 earthquake struck the Kuril Islands on October 10.
  A magnitude 6.0 earthquake struck Vanuatu on October 11.
 A magnitude 6.2 earthquake occurred in the Western Indian Ocean on October 12.
  A magnitude 6.2 earthquake struck Vanuatu on October 12.
  A magnitude 6.5 earthquake struck the Aleutian Islands, Alaska on October 13.
  A magnitude 6.0 earthquake struck the Molucca Sea on October 13.
  A magnitude 6.4 earthquake struck the Aleutian Islands, Alaska on October 13.
  A magnitude 6.3 earthquake struck Samoa on October 14.
  A magnitude 6.0 earthquake struck Papua, Indonesia on October 15.
  A magnitude 6.0 earthquake struck offshore the Galapagos Islands on October 15.
  A magnitude 6.1 earthquake struck the Sunda Strait on October 16.
  A magnitude 6.0 earthquake struck Samoa on October 19.
  A magnitude 6.0 earthquake struck near Panama on October 22.
  A magnitude 6.2 earthquake struck Afghanistan on October 22, killing 5 people.
  A magnitude 6.0 earthquake struck Vanuatu on October 23.
  A magnitude 6.9 earthquake struck the Banda Sea on October 24.
  A magnitude 6.0 earthquake struck Tonga on October 25.
  A magnitude 6.0 earthquake struck near Livingston Island, Antarctica on October 27.
  A magnitude 6.2 earthquake struck the Afghanistan on October 29.
  A magnitude 6.8 earthquake struck the Ryukyu Islands, Japan on October 30.

November

  A magnitude 6.2 earthquake struck Tonga on November 2.
  A magnitude 6.0 earthquake struck near Auckland Island on November 5.
  A magnitude 6.6 earthquake struck Sumbawa, Indonesia on November 8, killing 2 people.
  A magnitude 7.3 earthquake struck Fiji on November 9.
  A magnitude 6.0 earthquake struck the Nicobar Islands on November 10.
  A magnitude 6.5 earthquake struck offshore Tarapaca, Chile on November 13.
  A magnitude 6.2 earthquake struck Jujuy, Argentina on November 14.
  A magnitude 6.6 earthquake struck the Queen Charlotte Islands on November 17.
  A magnitude 6.4 earthquake struck Fiji on November 22.
  A magnitude 6.2 earthquake struck the Kermadec Islands on November 22.
  A magnitude 6.8 earthquake struck Tonga on November 24.
  A magnitude 6.0 earthquake struck Sumba, Indonesia on November 28.
  A magnitude 6.0 earthquake struck the Kermadec Islands on November 28.
  A magnitude 6.1 earthquake struck near Mindanao, Philippines on November 28.

December 

 A magnitude 6.0 earthquake struck the South Pacific Ocean on December 3.
  A magnitude 3.5 earthquake struck South Africa on December 6, killing 2 people.
  A magnitude 5.9 earthquake struck Malawi on December 8, killing 1 person.
  A magnitude 6.4 earthquake struck Vanuatu on December 9.
 A magnitude 6.4 earthquake struck the South Atlantic Ocean on December 9.
  A magnitude 6.0 earthquake struck Simeulue, Indonesia on December 9.
  A magnitude 6.3 earthquake struck the Sea of Okhotsk on December 10.
  A magnitude 6.0 earthquake struck the Solomon Islands on December 14.
  A magnitude 6.4 earthquake struck Taiwan on December 19.
  A magnitude 6.0 earthquake struck Malawi on December 19, killing 3 people.
  A magnitude 6.0 earthquake struck Sumatra, Indonesia on December 23.
  A magnitude 6.3 earthquake struck the Sea of Japan on December 24.
  A magnitude 6.1 earthquake struck the Banda Sea on December 26.
 A magnitude 6.0 earthquake struck the South Pacific Ocean on December 31.

See also
 List of 21st-century earthquakes

References

2009
2009